Bembecia uroceriformis is a moth of the family Sesiidae. It is found in France, Spain, Portugal, Switzerland, Italy and most of the Balkan Peninsula. It is also found in North Africa (including Morocco) and from Asia Minor to the Caucasus.

The wingspan is 20–24 mm.

The larvae feed on Dorycnium species (including Dorycnium herbaceum), Lotus corniculatus, Ulex europaeus, Ulex nanus, Coronilla emerus, Chamaecytisus species, Cytisus procumbens, Cytisus hirsutus and Corothamnus procumbens.

Subspecies
Bembecia uroceriformis uroceriformis 
Bembecia uroceriformis armoricana (Oberthür, 1907)

References

Moths described in 1834
Sesiidae
Moths of Europe
Moths of Africa
Moths of Asia